is a Japanese manga writer and illustrator. Almost all of his works center around the culinary arts. He graduated from Keio University with a degree in economics. Ogawa is most famous for the manga Chūka Ichiban, which was made into an anime.

In 2007, Ogawa won the 31st Kodansha Manga Award for children's manga for Tenshi no Frypan.

Works
Chūka Ichiban! (1995, Kodansha, Weekly Shōnen Magazine)
Jipangu Hououden (2001, Kodansha, Weekly Shōnen Magazine) (author Kazutoshi Ozasa)
Food Hunter Futaraiden (2004, Kodansha, Weekly Shōnen Magazine) (author Kazutoshi Ozasa)
Bakumatsu Futaraiden (2005, Kodansha, Magazine Special)
Tenshi no Frypan (2006, Kodansha, Comic Bom Bom)
Astraia no Tenbin (2009, Kodansha, Afternoon) (author Ichiro Takeuchi)
Asakusa-bito (2012, Nihon Bungeisha, Weekly Manga Goraku) (author Masaharu Nabeshima)

References

Manga artists from Niigata Prefecture
Living people
Keio University alumni
1969 births